Vladimir Iosifovich Kondrashov (2 February 1909 – 26 February 1971) was a Soviet mathematician most well known for proving the Rellich–Kondrachov theorem that shows that the embedding of certain Sobolev spaces into Lp spaces is compact. His name has also been transliterated as V.I. Kondrachoff, W. Kondrachov, or V.I. Kondrašov.

Life 
He graduated with a PhD from Moscow State University under the supervision of Sergei Sobolev in 1941. As a postdoc at Steklov Institute, where he obtained a DSc in 1950, he organised the Moscow Seminar on the Theory of Functions of Several Variables.
For the final 20 years of his life until his death on 26 February 1971, he worked at the Moscow Engineering and Physics Institute.

References

External links 

Photo of Kondrashov

1909 births
1971 deaths
Soviet mathematicians
Mathematicians from Moscow
Moscow State University alumni
Moscow Engineering Physics Institute
Place of birth missing